A serial computer is a computer typified by bit-serial architecture i.e., internally operating on one bit or digit for each clock cycle. Machines with serial main storage devices such as acoustic or magnetostrictive delay lines and rotating magnetic devices were usually serial computers.

Serial computers require much less hardware than their parallel computing counterpart, but are much slower. There are modern variants of the serial computer available as a soft microprocessor which can serve niche purposes where size of the CPU is the main constraint.

The first computer that was not serial (the first parallel computer) was the Whirlwind in 1951.

A serial computer is not necessarily the same as a computer with a 1-bit architecture, which is a subset of the serial computer class. 1-bit computer instructions operate on data consisting of single bits, whereas a serial computer can operate on N-bit data widths, but does so a single bit at a time.

Serial machines 
 EDVAC (1949)
 BINAC (1949)
 SEAC (1950)
 UNIVAC I (1951)
 Elliott Brothers Elliott 152 (1954)
 Bendix G-15 (1956)
 LGP-30 (1956)
 Elliott Brothers Elliott 803 (1958)
 ZEBRA (1958)
 D-17B guidance computer (1962)
 PDP-8/S (1966)
 General Electric GE-PAC 4040 process control computer
 F14 CADC (1970)  transferred all data serially, but internally operated on many bits in parallel
 Kenbak-1 (1971)
 Datapoint 2200 (1971)
 HP-35 (1972)

Massively parallel 
Most of the early massive parallel processing machines were built out of individual serial processors, including:
 ICL Distributed Array Processor (1979)
 Goodyear MPP (1983)
 Connection Machine CM-1 (1985)
 Connection Machine CM-2 (1987)
 MasPar MP-1 (1990)  32-bit architecture, internally processed 4 bits at a time
 VIRAM1 computational RAM (2003)

See also 
 1-bit computing
 BKM algorithm
 CORDIC algorithm

References

Further reading 
  (xiv+306 pages)
 Parhi, Keshab K., "A Systematic Approach for Design of Digit-Serial Signal Processing Architectures," IEEE Trans. on Circuits and Systems, Vol. 38, No. 4, April 1991, pp. 358-375, https://doi.org/10.1109/31.75394

Classes of computers
Serial computers